Vukašin Vorkapić (born 1 October 1997) is a Serbian handball player for RK Metaloplastika and the Serbian national team.

He represented Serbia at the 2019 World Men's Handball Championship.

References

1997 births
Living people
Serbian male handball players
Competitors at the 2022 Mediterranean Games
Mediterranean Games bronze medalists for Serbia
Mediterranean Games medalists in handball